Indiglo is a product feature on watches marketed by Timex, incorporating an electroluminescent panel as a backlight for even illumination of the watch dial.

The brand is owned by Indiglo Corporation, which is in turn solely owned by Timex, and the name derives from the word indigo, as the original watches featuring the technology emitted a green-blue light. The Indiglo name was originally developed by Austin Innovations Inc.

Timex introduced the Indiglo technology in 1992 in their Ironman watch line and subsequently expanded its use to 70% of their watch line, including men's and women's watches, sport watches and chronographs. Casio introduced their version of electroluminescent backlight technology in 1995.

Indiglo backlights typically emit a distinct greenish-blue color and evenly light the entire display or dial. Certain Indiglo models, e.g., Timex Datalink USB, use a negative liquid-crystal display so that only the digits are illuminated, rather than the entire display.

TX subdivision and Indiglo
From 2006-2011, the Timex Group marketed a line of high-end quartz watches under the TX Watch Company brand, using a proprietary six-hand, four-motor, micro-processor controlled movement. To separate the brand from Timex, the movements had luxury features associated with a higher-end brand, e.g.,  sapphire crystals and stainless steel or titanium casework — and used hands treated with super-luminova luminescent pigment for low-light legibility — rather than indiglo technology. 

When the Timex Group migrated the microprocessor-controlled, multi-motor, multi-hand technology to its Timex brand in 2012, it created a sub-collection marketed as Intelligent Quartz (IQ).  The line employed the same movements and capabilities from the TX brand, at a much lower price-point -- incorporating indiglo technology rather than the super-luminova pigments.

References

External links
 
 How does an Indiglo watch work? at HowStuffWorks
 Overview of electroluminescent display technology, and the discovery of electroluminescence
 Electroluminescence, Edison Technology Center

Products introduced in 1992
Luminescence
Trademarks
Watch brands
Lighting
Display technology
Timex Group